2013 was the sixth competitive season for the Cairns based Skill360 Northern Pride Rugby League Football Club. They competed in the QRL state competition, the Intrust Super Cup. 12 clubs competed, with each club playing 22 matches (11 home, 11 away and 2 byes) over 24 rounds.

The Pride finished first and won their first Minor Premiership. Head Coach Jason Demetriou was awarded the Men of League Coach of the Year. The Pride lost both Finals games (the Major Semi-Final and the Preliminary Final) and missed out on a Grand Final appearance. At the end of the season Captain Ty Williams retired. 
Northern Pride 2013 ISC video highlights (10 Videos).

2013 Season -  Skill360 Northern Pride

Staff
 Coach: Jason Demetriou
 Assistant coaches: Ben Rauter and Joe O'Callaghan
 Team Captain: Ty Williams
 Club Captain:
 Trainer: Deb Gallop
 Strength and conditioning Coach: Patrick Ranasinghe
 Physiotherapist: Tim Laycock
 Team manager: Rob White
 Chief Executive: Chris Sheppard resigned in April 2013, and was replaced the following month by Northern Pride business development manager, Brock Schaefer.
 Chairman: Bob Fowler
 Competition: Intrust Super Cup

Player awards
 Sea Swift Most improved player - Shaun Nona
 Sea Swift Season Members Player of the Year - Hezron Murgha
 Sea Swift Best Back - Sam Obst
 Sea Swift Best Forward - Ethan Lowe
 Sea Swift Players' Player - Hezron Murgha
 Skill360 Australia Northern Pride Player of the Year - Davin Crampton
 John O'Brien Club Person of the Year - Cameron Penny
 XXXX People's Choice Award: Hezron Murgha
 Men of League Coach of the Year: Jason Demetriou
 Intrust Super Cup Leading Try Scorer: Davin Crampton

2013 player gains
  Sam Obst from Keighley Cougars
  Semi Tadulala from Keighley Cougars
  Steve Snitch from Castleford Tigers
  Jordan Tighe from Gold Coast Titans NYC Under 20s
  Nick Dorante from North Queensland Cowboys NYC Under 20s
  Tom Hancock from North Queensland Cowboys NYC Under 20s
  Mervyn Walker from Ipswich Jets
 Aidan Smith from Northcote Tigers
 Brian Murgha from CDRL Cairns Marlins and Edmonton Storm
 Jordan Biondi-Odo from CDRL Innisfail Brothers

Player losses after 2012 season
  Chey Bird (retired)
  Brenton Bowen (retired)
  Mark Dalle Cort (released)
  Ben Fitzpatrick (released)
  Mitchell Seri (released)
  Scott Gibson (released)
  Rod Jensen to CDRL Mareeba Gladiators
  Ethan Lowe to North Queensland Cowboys 
  Sosaia Makisi to Wynnum Manly Seagulls

2013 Squad

 Jordan Tighe (fullback)

 Semi Tadulala (wing)

 Hezron Murgha (fullback / wing)

 Justin Castellaro (wing)

 Brett Anderson (centre)

 Davin Crampton (centre / wing)

 Rickki Sutherland (centre)

 Ty Williams (c) (centre / five-eighth)

 Shaun Nona (halfback / five-eighth)

 Jordan Biondi-Odo (halfback)

 Sam Obst (halfback / hooker)

 Ryan Ghietti (halfback / hooker)

 Alex Starmer (Prop)  

 Ben Laity (Prop)

 Jason Roos (Hooker)

 Steve Snitch (Prop / Second Row)

 Ben Spina (Lock / Second Row)

 Aidan Smith

 Nick Dorante (Prop)

 Maddie Oosen (Hooker)

 Brent Oosen (Second Row)

 Jamie Frizzo (Second Row)

 Tom Hancock (Second Row)

 Noel Underwood (Prop / Hooker)

 Mervyn Walker

 Brian Murgha

 Scott Bolton

 Matthew Bowen

 Kyle Feldt

 Ashley Graham

 Dallas Johnson

 Felise Kaufusi

 Blake Leary

 Ethan Lowe

 Robert Lui

 Scott Moore

 Joel Riethmuller

 Tariq Sims

 James Tamou

 Ray Thompson

 Ricky Thorby

 Wayne Ulugia

Dylan Taylor

Zac Parter

Bradley Stephen (Pride Under-18 Squad)

Josateki Murray (Pride Under-18 Squad)

Pete Tognolini (Pride Under-18 Squad)

2013 Season Launch
 Thursday, 14 March 2013. 7.00pm at Mount Sheridan Plaza.

Pre Season Boot Camp
 Lake Tinaroo, Atherton Tablelands - Friday 18-Sunday 20 January 2013.

2013 Jerseys

Trial Matches

Intrust Super Cup matches

2013 Ladder

Finals Series

2013 Northern Pride players

North Queensland Cowboys who played for the Northern Pride in 2013

2013 Televised Games

Channel Nine
In August 2012 as part of the historic $1 billion five-year broadcasting agreement with Nine and Fox Sports, the Australian Rugby League Commission confirmed that Intrust Super Cup matches would continue to be televised by Channel 9 until 2018. One match a week will be shown live across Queensland at 2.00pm (AEST) on Sunday afternoons on Channel 9, WIN Television (RTQ), in remote areas on Imparja Television and in Papua New Guinea on Kundu 2 TV. The 2013 commentary team was Peter Psaltis, Paul Green, Matthew Thompson, Scott Sattler and Adrian Vowles.
 1: Northern Pride won 24-22 : Round 2, Sunday, 24 March 2013 against Burleigh Bears 2.00pm from Pizzey Park, Miami, Gold Coast.
 2: Northern Pride won 24-8 : Round 12, Sunday, 2 June 2013 against Easts Tigers 2.00pm from Langlands Park, Stones Corner, Brisbane.
 3: Northern Pride won 36-16: Round 15, Sunday, 23 June 2013 against Redcliffe Dolphins 2.00pm from Dolphin Oval, Redcliffe.
 4: Northern Pride lost 26-16: Round 17, Sunday, 7 July 2013 against Mackay Cutters 12.30pm (telecast delayed to 2.00pm) from Virgin Australia Stadium, Mackay.
 5: Northern Pride won 38-6: Round 18, Sunday, 14 July 2013 against Norths Devils 2.00pm from Bishop Park, Nundah.
 6: Northern Pride won 44-12: Round 22, Sunday, 18 August 2013, against Burleigh Bears 2.00pm from Barlow Park, Cairns.
 7: Northern Pride lost 16-29: Major Semi-Final, 15 September 2013, against Easts Tigers 1.30pm from Barlow Park, Cairns.
 8: Northern Pride lost 6-20: Preliminary Final, Sunday, 22 September 2013, against Mackay Cutters 2.00pm from Langlands Park, Stones Corner, Brisbane.

Live Streaming
In 2013, all matches (including pre-season trials but excluding matches broadcast live by Channel Nine) were streamed live through the Pride website, with access granted exclusively to Pride members. Video production was by Studio Productions and the commentary team was Adam Jackson and Northern Pride Under-18s coach, Cameron 'Spiller' Miller.

References

External links
 Northern Pride Official site
 Northern Pride Facebook Page
 Northern Pride Twitter Page
 Northern Pride YouTube Page
 2012 Northern Pride match highlights on YouTube

Northern Pride RLFC seasons
2013 in Australian rugby league
2013 in rugby league by club